Galinthias occidentalis is a species of praying mantis native to western Africa.

It is found in Ghana, Guinea, Cameroon, Ivory Coast−Côte d'Ivoire, and Sierra Leone.

See also
List of mantis genera and species
Mantodea of Africa

References

Galinthiadidae
Mantodea of Africa
Insects of Cameroon
Insects of West Africa
Insects described in 1930